Kim Beomseok (born October 7, 1978), known professionally in the West as Bom Kim, is a Korean-American businessman and internet entrepreneur. He is known for founding Korea's largest e-commerce company Coupang, and serves as its chief executive officer, and controlling shareholder. In 2018, SoftBank Vision Fund invested $2 billion on Coupang, valuating the company at $9 billion, and making Kim South Korea's newest and second-youngest billionaire at the age of 40. As of June 2021, Kim's net worth is $6.79 billion.

Education and career
He was born in Seoul but left Korea at the age of 7. At age 13, he went to boarding school in Massachusetts at Deerfield Academy, where he lettered in varsity wrestling and track and later attended Harvard University; He later attended Harvard Business School but dropped out after only six months.

After interning at The New Republic and starting a student magazine called Current, Kim briefly worked at Boston Consulting Group before raising $4 million to start the magazine 02138, named after Harvard's ZIP Code, which soon folded. He then started Coupang.

Coupang

Kim founded Coupang in 2010 and since then has gone on to raise more than $3.8 billion in venture capital from investors such as Sequoia Capital, Softbank, BlackRock, and others.

It began as a Groupon-like website and now operates as an online retailer and operates a 24-hour logistics service called Rocket Delivery. It was reported in 2018 that Coupang would gross 2.7 trillion won in annual sales and lost 1.7 trillion won between 2015 and 2017 and maintains over 3.5 million daily active users as of 2019.

The company currently employs over 40,000 people with offices in Seoul, Shanghai, Beijing, Los Angeles, Seattle and Silicon Valley.

References

Living people
South Korean businesspeople
South Korean billionaires
Harvard University alumni
1978 births